Mew is a surname. Notable people with the surname include:

Charlotte Mew (1869–1928), English poet
Chris Mew (born 1961), Australian rules footballer
Darren James Mew (born 1975), English music producer
Darren Mew (born 1979), British swimmer
John Mew (born 1928), British orthodontist
Jack Mew (1889–1963), English football goalkeeper
James Mew (1837–1913), English lawyer and biographer
Peter Mew, British audio engineer
William Mew (1602–c. 1669), English clergyman, playwright and beekeeper